Mataheko is a town in the Ablekuma Central Municipal  district, a district of the Greater Accra Region of Ghana.

References

Populated places in the Greater Accra Region